Wales competed at the 1958 British Empire and Commonwealth Games in Cardiff, Wales, from 18 July to 26 July 1958.

Medalists

Athletics
The athletics tournament was held at the Cardiff Arms Park. The results for the Welsh athletes are as below:

Men
Track

Field events

Women
Track

Field events

Boxing
The boxing events were held at Sophia Gardens Pavilion. The results for the Welsh athletes are as below:

Cycling
The cycling tournament was held at the Maindy Stadium. The results for the Welsh athletes are as below:

Track

Road

Diving
The diving tournament was held at the Wales Empire Pool. The results for the Welsh athletes are as below:
Men

Fencing
The fencing tournament was held at Cae'r Castell School. The results for the Welsh athletes are as below:
Men - Team

Men - Individual

Women - Individual

Lawn Bowls
The lawn bowls tournament was held at the Cardiff Bowls Club. The results for the Welsh athletes are as below:

Rowing
The rowing events were held at the Lake Padarn in Llanberis. The results for the Welsh athletes are as below:

Swimming
The swimming tournament was held at the Wales Empire Pool. The results for the Welsh athletes are as below:
Men

Women

Wrestling
The wrestling events were held at Sophia Gardens Pavilion. The results for the Welsh athletes are as below:

Weightlifting
The weightlifting tournament was held at the Cae'r Castell School. The results for the Welsh athletes are as below:

References

Bibliography
 

1958
Nations at the 1958 British Empire and Commonwealth Games
British Empire and Commonwealth Games